Baras, officially the Municipality of Baras,  is a 4th class municipality in the province of Rizal, Philippines. According to the 2020 census, it has a population of 87,637 people.

History
In 1595, the Franciscan missionaries under the leadership of Fr. Juan de Placencia and Fr. Diego de Oropesa, founded a “visita” for Morong on the present site of Bosoboso, south of Painaan with Apostol Santiago as its patron saint. It was known as “Visita de Santiago” or Santiago until such time that it became Baras. Baras was then inhabited by 400 Aetas and other mountain people.

In 1636, the town was transferred to a place called Ibayo, one and one-half leagues southeast of the first site due to the hostility of the Aetas and the mountaineers who burned part of the town and church in 1635. San Salvador became their patron saint. However, the town and church of Baras was burned by Chinese rebels in 1639, who were retreating from Manila to the Sierra Madre mountains.

The ecclesiastical administration of Baras was given back by the Jesuits to the Franciscan in 1679. Two years later In 1682, the town was transferred to its present site where they would not be menaced by marauding tribes of the mountaineers.

Baras was under the jurisdiction of the province of Laguna from 1606 to 1853. Its administration was transferred to the newly created Distrito Politico-Militar de los Montes de San Mateo. This district was renamed to Distrito de Morong in 1857 whose capital was in Antipolo but was later transferred to Morong.

In July 1895, the representatives of Katipunan came to inform the people of Morong, Tanay, Antipolo, Baras and Pililla about the cause of the secret society. The Katipunan of Baras established the Real or Military Camp at sitio of Gogo or Pamitinan. On November 21, 1896, the Katipunan attempted to capture the town of Morong but were driven by the Guardia Civil. By 1898, Baras had joined the Revolutionary Government of Emilio Aguinaldo.

After the defeat of the Spaniards in Morong, the Aguinaldo Headquarters ordered the establishment of the municipal township. A special election was held. However, the Revolutionary Government of Aguinaldo did not last because of the outbreak of the Filipino-American War. On March 29, 1900, Military Order No. 40, by Governor General Meritt came in effect. This order was for the election of an Alcalde Municipal, Vice Alcalde, and the Municipal Council. This was implemented in October of the same year.

Act No. 942 was passed by the Philippine Commission in 1901, providing the establishment of the Province of Rizal to be comprised in part of towns from the former Distrito de Morong. Baras effectively became part of the new province. However, on October 12, 1903, it was annexed to the town of Morong.

On January 16, 1906, Baras was annexed to Tanay by virtue of Act No. 1442. But as Baras was not represented as a barrio of Tanay, and previously under Morong, there was a movement for the separation of Baras as an independent town. Under the leadership of Leopoldo Digma, the clamor was realized through Executive Order No. 57, dated November 24, 1920, establishing the Municipality of Baras.

World War II and after
During the Second World War, the Imperial Japanese armed forces occupied and entered the municipal town of Baras in 1942.  The local guerrillas of the General Marking Unit sieged and invaded the town of Baras and attacked the Japanese from 1942 to 1945. The local Filipino troops of the Philippine Commonwealth Army and the Philippine Constabulary units liberated the municipality of Baras in 1945. The guerrillas of the General Marking Units defeated the Japanese forces, and it ended World War II.

The Military General Headquarters and Camp Bases of the 53rd Infantry Division of the Philippine Commonwealth Army was established and active from January 3, 1942, to June 30, 1946, and built Camp Caparas in Baras. The military engagements of the Anti-Japanese Operations in Manila and Southern Luzon aided the local guerrilla resistance fighters and U.S. military forces against the Japanese Imperial forces.

The town of Baras was razed to the ground on March 10, 1945. This signified the liberation of the town but also left many homeless. The rehabilitation of the town began. War damage claims were filed to the amount of P 300,000 to be used for the construction of new houses. Then mayor, Mariano Golla, focused on the improvement of roads and the construction of a public dispensary. Under his term, Baras was elevated to a fourth-class municipality due to an increase in income.

Under the succeeding administrations, improvements of road networks were implemented; seven liberty wells were constructed; the number of schoolhouses were increased; river controls in Barangay San Juan and San Jose were constructed; rehabilitation of the existing government building continued; and a reforestation program was launched.

Geography

Barangays

Baras is politically subdivided into 10 barangays (1 urban, 9 rural):

 Evangelista
 Rizal (Poblacion)
 San Jose
 San Salvador
 Santiago
 Concepcion
 San Juan
 San Miguel
 Mabini
 Pinugay

Climate

Demographics

Economy

Tourism

Diocesan Shrine and Parish of Saint Joseph (Baras Church) 

The oldest and most notable landmark in Baras is the Diocesan Shrine and Parish of Saint Joseph, it enshrines the miraculous venerated image of San Jose de Baras. The Church was built by the Franciscan missionaries in 1682, the same year the town was transferred to its present site. It was completed in 1686 and was dedicated to St. Joseph, the town's patron saint. It is known for having paniki in its ceiling. The Church has been seen in well-known international and local films, TV series and commercials.

Palo Alto Falls 

This breathtaking man-made falls in Palo Alto is just an hour drive from the town's population. Located in Marcos Highway (Marikina–Infanta Highway)

Kinamatayan Falls 

Legend says two lovers who had family issues committed suicide to the falls so no one will be able to separate them. The Falls is now being managed by the Local Government Unit. Few minutes of hike will take you to the cold as ice falls of Kinamatayan..

Masungi Georeserve 

A conservation area adjacent to Garden Cottages located in the mountainous section Marcos Highway (Markina-Infanta Highway) of Baras by its border with Tanay, Rizal.

Other places 

 The site of the 53rd Infantry Division of the Philippine Commonwealth Army, the military general headquarters, military camps and garrison was located at Camp Caparas in Concepcion, Baras, Rizal from January 3, 1942, to June 30, 1946. During the Battle for the Liberation of Manila in 1945, over 15,700 Filipino soldiers, tanks, armored fighting vehicles, military trucks, artilleries and many other equipment of the 53rd Infantry Division of the Philippine Commonwealth Army sent the military operations from Military GHQ at Camp Caparas in Baras, Rizal for the military operations in the City of Manila in February to March 1945.
 It was the site of the General Agustin Marking Guerrilla Unit which was founded in 1942 to 1945 at the guerrilla bases from the mountains in Baras, Rizal.

Sikaran 
Baras is also the home of the Philippines' native martial arts', Sikaran. This ancient martial art was popular among the Farmers in the Village of Bara even before the Spanish conquest of the Philippine Archipelago in 1521.

Hari Osias Banaag, originator of the Global Sikaran Federation and diplomat for the Traditional game, He recently attended and was warmly received at the UNESCO Collective Consultation Meeting on the Preservation and the Promotion of Traditional Sports and Game (TSG). Hari Osias Banaag is an appointed member of Ad hoc Advisory Committee Traditional Sports and Games, UNESCO(TSG).

References

External links

Baras Profile at PhilAtlas.com
Baras Rizal Online - Community website of the People of Baras, Rizal
Official Website of the Municipal Government of Baras, Rizal
[ Philippine Standard Geographic Code]
Philippine Census Information
Local Governance Performance Management System

Municipalities of Rizal
Populated places on Laguna de Bay